The 1920 Colorado Silver and Gold football team was an American football team that represented the University of Colorado as a member of the Rocky Mountain Conference (RMC) during the 1920 college football season. In its first season under head coach Myron E. Witham, the team compiled a 4–1–2 record (3–1–2 against RMC opponents), tied for third place in the conference, and outscored opponents by a total of 99 to 28.

Schedule

References

Colorado
Colorado Buffaloes football seasons
Colorado Silver and Gold football